Ronald K. Hoeflin (born February 23, 1944) is an American philosopher by profession, creator of the Mega and Titan intelligence tests. In 1988, Hoeflin won the American Philosophical Association's Rockefeller Prize for his article, "Theories of Truth: A Comprehensive Synthesis." His article argues for the interrelated nature of seven leading theories of truth. Hoeflin claims an IQ of 164, admitting his scores have ranged from 125 to 175, depending upon the cognitive abilities tapped into.

Biography
Hoeflin was born on February 23, 1944, to William Eugene Hoeflin (July 1, 1902 — 1993) and Mary Elizabeth Dell Hoeflin (born May 15, 1913 in Ocklocknee, Georgia), who married in 1938. Hoeflin has one sister (born 1939), who eventually pursued a career in ballet, and one brother (born 1942), who is now a computer programmer specializing in actuarial work. Hoeflin grew up in St Louis, Missouri. As a young child he memorized pi to 200 places. He received a PhD in Philosophy from The New School for Social Research. For over a decade, he has been working on a thirteen-volume treatise titled "The Encyclopedia of Categories", which has now been published online and is available for free download.

Intelligence tests and societies 

For over sixty years, psychologists such as Leta Stetter Hollingworth, author of the book Children Above 180 IQ, have suggested that people with extremely high IQs are radically different from the general population. Identifying such people would require IQ tests with reliability not currently available for extreme ranges of IQ. 
    
Ronald Hoeflin has stated to have been a member of Mensa, Intertel, the International Society for Philosophical Enquiry and the Triple Nine Society, which he co-founded, as well as the Prometheus Society and the Mega Society, both of which he founded.

Hoeflin attempted, along with Kevin Langdon, to develop an IQ test that could measure adult IQs greater than three standard deviations from the population median, or IQ 145 (sd 15). Hoeflin's Mega Test was an unsupervised IQ test without time limit consisting of 48 questions, half verbal and half mathematical. It was published in Omni magazine, in April 1985, and the results were used to norm the test. Hoeflin standardized the test six times, using equipercentile equating with SAT and other scores, and some extrapolation at the highest level.

Societies Founded by Ronald Hoeflin 
Believing that people at the highest IQ levels would be able easily to communicate with each other and have much in common, Hoeflin founded several societies for those with the highest scores. All are active today. These societies are (along with year founded, percentile, and minimum IQ (sd 16)):

Individuals with top scores on Hoeflin tests 
The highest scorers on the Mega Test had their names printed in the Guinness Book of World Records  and were also profiled (along with Hoeflin) by Esquire under the title The Smartest Man in America. The Guinness book of World Records has since retired the category of "highest IQ" after concluding that IQ tests are not consistent enough to designate a single world record holder. One such individual of former World Record acclaim, Marilyn vos Savant was additionally profiled in New York magazine. This article also discusses Hoeflin and the Mega Society (the author of the Esquire article, Mike Sager, later used it as part of a book.) The Mega Test has been criticized by professional reviewers of psychological tests. In 1990, Hoeflin created the Titan Test, also published in Omni.

References

External links 

 "The Encyclopedia of Categories", Ronald Hoeflin's thirteen-volume treatise available for free download.

1944 births
Living people
Intelligence researchers
The New School alumni
American philosophers
American scientists
Mensans